Integral Humanism may refer to:

Integral humanism (Maritain), an aspect of Catholic social teaching originally advocated by French philosopher Jacques Maritain as "Integral Christian Humanism"
Integral humanism (India), the political philosophy practised by the Bharatiya Janata Party and the former Bharatiya Jana Sangh of India